The Dhagi are Hindu caste, found in North India.

History and origin
The name Dhagi is derived from the Hindi word dhaga, which means thread.  The community spin thread and weave cloth. They are one of a number of communities that have traditional been involved with weaving and spinning, such as the Sadh, Kori and Momin Ansari.

Present circumstances
The traditional occupation of the Dhagi was weaving and spinning thread. With growing industrialisation of the Indian economy, the Dhagi have abandoned their traditional occupations. They are now mainly engaged in agriculture.

The community have a fairly strong caste council, which maintains social control over the community. Any member of the community which breaches their cultural norms, can be subject to cash fines, or social ostracism.  They are a Hindu community, and follows the general customs of the area they reside. A small number of Dhagi, have converted  to Islam, and now form a distinct community of Muslim Dhagi. The community is concentrated in the Awadh region of Uttar Pradesh, and neighbouring state of Bihar. They speak Awadhi and Bhojpuri.

See also
Bhuiyar (North India Weavers)
Muslim Dhagi
Sadh
Kori
Momin Ansari

References

Social groups of Uttar Pradesh
Social groups of Bihar
Indian castes
Weaving communities of South Asia